Voice of Love is a compilation album by American singer Diana Ross. It was released by EMI International on November 29, 1996. The album consists of some of Ross' best known love songs and also included three previously unreleased songs: "In the Ones You Love", "I Hear (The Voice of Love)," co-written by Ross, and a take on Michael Jackson's "You Are Not Alone," penned by R. Kelly. Photographer Randee St. Nicholas was commissioned to create the album cover art, tour merchandising and the high fashion music video for lead single "In the Ones You Love".

The album peaked at number 42 on the UK Albums Chart and was eventually certified gold by the British Phonographic Industry (BPI) in 2019. In support of Voice of Love, Ross embarked on a 28 market European tour in 1997, selling out venues across Great Britain and makings rare appearances in Central and Eastern Europe markets like Bucharest, Brussels and Vienna.  In Asian markets, the album title was Gift of Love. The set included three songs not found on any other Diana Ross CD, including a hit in Pan Asian territories, "Promise Me You'll Try".

Track listing

Charts

Certifications

References

1996 compilation albums
Diana Ross compilation albums
EMI Records compilation albums